Blyth is a town and civil parish in southeast Northumberland, England. It had a population of 37,339 in the 2011 Census.

The port of Blyth dates from the 12th century, but the development of the modern town only began in the first quarter of the 18th century. The main industries which helped the town prosper were coal mining and shipbuilding, with the salt trade, fishing and the railways also playing an important role. These industries have largely vanished, but the port still thrives, receiving paper and pulp from Scandinavia for the newspaper industries of England and Scotland.

The town was seriously affected when its principal industries went into decline, and it has undergone much regeneration since the early 1990s. The Keel Row Shopping Centre, opened in 1991, brought major high street retailers to Blyth, and helped to revitalise the town centre. The market place has recently been re-developed, with the aim of attracting further investment to the town.

The Quayside has also seen much redevelopment and has been transformed into a peaceful open space, the centrepiece of which is a sculpture commemorating the industry that once thrived there. On the opposite side of the river are the nine wind turbines of the Blyth Harbour Wind Farm, which were constructed along the East Pier in 1992. They were joined in 2000 by Blyth Offshore Wind Farm, which consisted of two turbines situated  out to sea. These were the first two offshore wind turbines in the UK. These wind turbines were all decommissioned, with the final two being removed in 2019. A new wind farm further off the coast, composed of five turbines, was commissioned in 2017.

Blyth is also home to the non-League football club Blyth Spartans, famed for their 1978 "giant-killing" feats in the FA Cup.

History 

The place-name Blyth is first attested in 1130 as Blida, and takes its name from the river Blyth. The river's name comes from the Old English adjective blīðe meaning 'gentle' or 'merry'. The town of Blyth is referred to as Blithmuth in 1236 and Blithemuth in 1250. Had this name persisted, the town would today be referred to as "Blythmouth", on the analogy of Tynemouth to the south.

Little is known of the early development of the Blyth area.  The oldest archaeological find is an antler hammer dating from the late Neolithic or early Bronze Age period, which was found at Newsham in 1979.
Human skulls, a spearhead and a sword dating from the Bronze Age were found in the river in 1890, as well as a bronze axe which was found at South Beach in 1993, and a dagger found at Newsham.  Although there is no conclusive evidence of a Roman presence in the area, an earthwork shown on early mapping of the area, at the location of present-day Freehold Street, is said to have been a Roman camp, but it has also been argued that it may be of Norsemen origin or date from the Civil War.  Debate also surrounds a mosaic which was found near Bath Terrace.  The strongest evidence so far has been a single coin, dating from the reign of the Emperor Constans (AD337–350), which was found during excavations for a dry dock. Also four Roman coins were found when digging an air raid shelter in a back garden on Chestnut Avenue.

Between the 12th and 18th centuries, there were several small settlements and some industrial activity in the area.  The principal industries during this period were coal mining, fishing and the salt trade.  Shipbuilding in the area dates from 1748.

The modern town of Blyth began to develop in the first quarter of the 18th century.  Up until 1716, the land around the Blyth area—the Newsham Estate—was owned by the Earls of Derwentwater, but when the third Earl, James Radclyffe, was executed for his part in the Jacobite rising of 1715, the land was forfeited to the crown.  On 11 July 1723, the Lordship of Newsham was put up for sale by the Commissioners of Forfeited Estates at their office in the Inner Temple, London.  The land was bought by Matthew White and his brother-in-law Richard Ridley.  From the 12th century, most port activities were on the north side of the river, but under White and Ridley the first new quays and houses were built on the south side, and from here the port began to prosper.  By 1730, a coaling quay, a ballast quay, a pilots' watch house and a lighthouse had all been built at Blyth harbour.  In 1765 the first breakwater was constructed, and in 1788 the first staith with an elevated loading point was erected.  Deep mines were sunk at Cowpen Colliery and Cowpen Square in 1796 and 1804 respectively, and by 1855, a quarter of a million tons of coal was being shipped from Blyth, rising to three million tons by 1900.  The only industry not to survive during this prosperous time was the salt trade, which was heavily taxed during the 18th and early-19th centuries.  During the Napoleonic Wars, the tax was increased to provide funds for the military and, even though the tax was abolished in 1825, the industry went into terminal decline.  Having had fourteen salt pans at the beginning of the 18th century, exporting over 1,000 tons of salt annually, Blyth's salt industry closed in 1876, with the destruction of the last salt pan. At Easter in 1887, William Morris, the  poet and interior designer, met and addressed a considerable crowd of striking miners in the market square in Blyth. He spoke for about 40minutes and then led them  to Horton. They swelled the numbers there to around 6,0007,000 where Morris spoke again. They had been forced to take a 12.5% pay cut but according to The Newcastle Chronicle Morris said "But let them remember that they were many and the Masters few. Masters could only attack with a certain instrument and what was that instrument? A part of the working classes themselves"by which he meant the police. 

From the mid-19th century, several important events occurred which allowed the port of Blyth to rapidly expand.  First, in 1847, a railway line was constructed, connecting Blyth to collieries at Seghill. In 1853, the Blyth Harbour and Docks Board was formed, then in 1858 the Harbour Act was passed allowing dredging of the harbour to begin.  In 1882, the formation of the Blyth Harbour Commission led to the building of new coal loading staiths, as well as the construction of the South Harbour.

As trade in Blyth continued to grow, so did the population.  Development of the Cowpen Quay and Waterloo areas began in about 1810 and 1815 respectively, and between the 1850s and 1890s major house building took place in these areas.  Blyth railway station, first built in 1847, was relocated in 1867 and rebuilt in 1896, to cope with the increase in goods and passenger traffic.  The 1890s saw the filling in of "the Slake" (also known as "the Flanker" or "the Gut").  The Slake was a tidal inlet which stretched south from the river, across the site of today's bus station, along the route of Beaconsfield Street, and on past Crofton Mill Pit.  Before it was filled in, it almost entirely separated Blyth from Cowpen—Waterloo Bridge providing the only main link.  Once it was removed, the two areas could combine and allow the town to begin to take its present form.  The town continued to expand in the 20th century; much large-scale house building took place in the 1920s and 1930s, and from the 1950s to the 1970s.

Industry in Blyth reached its peak in the first half of the 20th century.  At this time it boasted one of the largest shipbuilding yards on the North East coast, with five dry docks and four building slipways. During the First and Second World Wars, the Blyth shipyards built many ships for the Royal Navy including the first aircraft carrier, HMS Ark Royal in 1914.  Blyth also served as a submarine base during both wars.  By 1930, the port of Blyth was exporting 5.5 million tons of coal, and by the early 1960s, reached its peak with over six million tons.  Blyth A and Blyth B power stations, collectively known as Blyth Power Station, were opened in 1958 and 1962. Blyth A was the first power station in Britain to have 120 megawatt sets installed, while Blyth B was the first to be fitted with 275 megawatt sets.

During the 1960s, Blyth entered a period of steep decline.  Following the Beeching report, the railway into Blyth was closed in 1965; and in 1966, economic depression resulted in the closure of the shipyards.  As the demand for coal fell, due to the increasing use of oil, natural gas and nuclear power as energy sources, the following years saw the closure of many collieries in the area.  By the 1980s, the only one left in the town was Bates' Pit, which closed in 1986.  In January 2002, Blyth Power Station was closed and demolished in stages, and on 7 December 2003, its four chimneys were felled.

Governance 

From around the first quarter of the 18th century, until November 1900, the land to the south of the River Blyth was known as South Blyth.  It was in the Parish of Earsdon and was run by the Parish Council until 1863, when the South Blyth Local Board was formed.  Under the Local Government Act of 1894, South Blyth Local Board became an Urban District Council, then in 1906 it was amalgamated with Cowpen Urban District Council to form Blyth Urban District Council.  On 21 September 1922, Blyth UDC became Blyth Municipal Borough Council, and in 1935 its southern boundary was moved south from Meggie's Burn to Seaton Burn.  Blyth MBC lasted until 1974, when it was amalgamated with Seaton Valley and Cramlington Urban District Councils, as well as part of Whitley Bay Urban District Council, to form Blyth Valley Borough Council.

Blyth was the administrative centre for the borough of Blyth Valley, until the borough was abolished in structural changes to local government on 1 April 2009.  Blyth Valley—which also included Cramlington and several villages—was 70 square kilometres in size and, according to the Registrar General's Population Estimate for mid-2005, it had a population of 81,600; this gives a population density of 1,166 people per square kilometre.  The two-tier local government of Northumberland County Council and Blyth Valley Borough Council has been replaced by a unitary authority for the county of Northumberland.  Blyth is situated in the parliament constituency of Blyth Valley, which shares its boundaries with the borough.  It is divided up into twenty wards, nine of which—Cowpen, Croft, Isabella, Kitty Brewster, Newsham and New Delaval, Plessey, South Beach, South Newsham, and Wensleydale—make up the town of Blyth.

Blyth is represented in the House of Commons, as part of the Blyth Valley constituency, by Ian Levy, a Conservative.

Blyth is twinned with Solingen, Germany. As part of Blyth Valley it was previously also twinned with Ratingen, Germany and Gelendzhik, Russia.

Geography 
On the north side of the river are the villages of East Sleekburn, Cambois and North Blyth and to the south of the town are the villages of New Hartley, Seaton Delaval and Seaton Sluice. Some of Blyth's suburbs have origins which can be traced back much further than the town itself; Newsham, Bebside and Cowpen are all believed to have had habitation sites dating from the Romano-British, Saxon and Medieval periods, although most of the housing in these areas dates from the 19th and 20th centuries. Also occupying the suburbs are several large housing estates; the Newsham Farm, South Beach and Solingen estates, and the Avenues were all developed during the 20th century. In January 2005, the land in Blyth was made up of 61.87% green space, 11.95% domestic gardens, 8.23% road, 4.85% domestic buildings, 2.03% non-domestic buildings and 11.07% other uses.

The geology of the area is made up of a carboniferous bedrock of sandstone, mudstone and coal, which is covered mainly by boulder clay and till.

Climate 
The climate in Northumberland is generally cool and dry.  Compared with the rest of the United Kingdom, the weather there is relatively stable, and extreme conditions, such as floods, droughts or heatwaves, are rare.  Below are the average maximum and minimum temperatures, and average rainfall recorded between 1971 and 2000 at the Met Office weather station in Boulmer, which is around 33 kilometres (21 mi) north of Blyth.

The average maximum temperatures between April and October are around 1–2½ °C lower than the national average and the average minimum temperatures between May and August are around ½ °C below the national average; both the average maximum and minimum temperatures for the remainder of the year are about the same as the national average.  The average rainfall in Northumberland is well below the national average; 651 millimetres (26 in) was recorded at Boulmer, compared to 838 millimetres (33 in) for the whole of England.

Transport links 
The main approach road to Blyth is the A189 Spine Road which is accessible from the A1 via the A19. The A193 is the main road through Blyth and leads to Bedlington to the west and North Tyneside to the south.  The other main route into Blyth is the A1061. Blyth bus station is located in Post Office Square in the town centre. Buses in Blyth are operated by Arriva North East and there are regular services to Newcastle as well as the other main towns in the south of Northumberland and the surrounding areas of Blyth. One service is operated by Go North East.

Blyth has no current passenger rail links – the nearest station is Cramlington. Blyth railway station was closed on 2 November 1964 following the Beeching Report. There were also two small stations on the outskirts of the town, at Bebside and Newsham; they were closed to passenger services in 1956 and 1964 respectively.

The Northumberland Line project is reopening a passenger rail service to Newsham by 2024.

Port of Blyth

The Port of Blyth was first recorded from 1138, when monks at Newminster Abbey exported salt, having created it from pans on the north side of the river and evaporated using the copious supplies of local coal. Coal exports started from the 14th century, with local mines recorded from the 16th century. In 1609 21,571 tons of coal were shipped from Blyth. The first large quay – Bishop's Quay, which still exists today – was developed by 1682. But the port was not dredged at this time, necessitating the use of Northumbrian keel boats to transfer the loads to ships moored offshore. By 1730 specific coaling and ballast quays existed, and by 1765 the ports facilities included a pilot house and lighthouse, to facilitate the newly built first breakwater, North Dyke. The High Lighthouse came into operation soon afterwards, operating until July 1984.

The port expanded greatly in the 19th century, with the purchase of a steam tug in 1819, and the rebuilding of the breakwater in 1822. By this point, three ship building yards had also been established. The construction of the Blyth and Tyne Railway from 1849 allowed coal shipments to quickly expand, reaching 200,000 tons per annum. The Blyth Harbour and Dock Company was created in 1854, but with need for further expansion, it was replaced by a bill of parliament given Royal Assent on 19 June 1882, which constituted the current Blyth Harbour Commission. This allowed additional financing to be raised, for construction of the South Harbour.

By the 20th century, through connection via the London and North Eastern Railway which had leased large amounts of land throughout the port, Blyth had started the growth to become the Europe's largest coal export port, exporting 5.5M tonnes per year by the late 1930s. This was also supplemented by ship building, including the opening of a facility by Hughes, Bolckow and Co of Middlesbrough. Large scale shipbuilding had begun in 1811, and after passing through various hands, in 1880 the first two iron ships were built at Blyth for the Russian Government. This led to the foundation of the Blyth Shipbuilding Company on 2 March 1883, building cargo liners, tramp steamers and colliers. With a cargo ship under construction, in 1914 she was purchased by the Admiralty and converted into the Navy's first seaplane carrier . The company returned to commercial ship building, but collapsed in 1925. It was then revived from 1926, but after merger with other local yards and in light of the Wall Street Crash and resultant global recession, collapsed again in 1930. Reopened under its original name in 1937, it built various ships in preparation for and during WW2, including the former German cargo ship Hannover which was converted into the escort carrier . Owned by Mollers (Hong Kong) Ltd post-WW2, it then built cargo-liners for Moller's subsidiary the Lancashire Shipping Company. The construction yard closed in 1967, with only repair work and ship dismantling sustaining business until the yards were demolished in the late 1980s to make room for a paper and timber storage area.

After World War 2, whilst most ports began to quickly contract, Blyth was still a major facility through the 1960s, when coal exports reached over 6 M tonnes per year. However, with the closure Blyth's last ship builder in 1966, the port began a significant period of contraction. The employment slack was in part taken up by the construction of the coal-fired Blyth Power Station, located on the northern bank. of the river. The A Station with 480 megawatts (MW) of capacity first generated electricity in 1958, a year after the creation of the Central Electricity Generating Board, and the B Station with a capacity of 1,250 MW four years later. They were operated by the successors of the CEGB, including National Power, following the privatisation of the UK's power industry. After their closure in 2001, the stations  were demolished over the course of two years, ending with the demolition of the stations' chimneys on 7 December 2003.

In 1997, The Port established Transped, the ports packing business. It has since diversified into logistics areas including import and export packing, customer depot facilities, distribution and storage, ships agency and European and worldwide forwarding.

Today, the Port of Blyth handles up to 1.5 million tonnes of cargo, mainly containers and RoRo, and some limited volumes of bulk cargos. A2B, a Dutch container company, operate twice-weekly shipping services to the Netherlands in partnership with Transped connecting the port to Germany, Belgium, the Netherlands and Luxembourg.

Economy

Industry and commerce 
With the running down of the coal mining and shipbuilding industries, Blyth largely exists today as a dormitory town in the commuter belt serving Newcastle and North Tyneside.  However, its port still remains a major industry in the area, handling over 1.5 million tonnes of cargo annually.  Its main trades are forest products, such as paper, pulp and timber, unitised cargo (containers and RoRo) and the import of materials used in the production of aluminium.  It also handles the import of a variety of stones and metals.  A twice weekly container service between the port and Moerdijk, near Rotterdam, provides connections with the Netherlands, Germany, Belgium and France as well as South America and the Far East.  The port is operated by Port of Blyth, which is the operating division of Blyth Harbour Commission.  Port of Blyth is a trust port, which means that it is governed by its own local legislation under the control of an independent board; there are no shareholders and therefore no dividends to support, which allows any surplus to be reinvested in the port.

Energy

Renewables
Several renewable energy projects have been established in Blyth.  In 1992, Blyth Harbour Wind Farm was constructed along Blyth's East Pier.  Consisting of nine wind turbines and with a maximum capacity of 2.7 megawatts, it can provide enough electricity for over 1,500 homes.  It was joined in December 2000 by Blyth Offshore Wind Farm, which was composed of two turbines situated 1 kilometre (0.6 mi) out to sea. These was the UK's first two offshore wind turbines. At 2 megawatts each, they were also, when installed, the largest in the world. The wind farm was decommissioned in 2019 by plant owner E.ON. E.ON also commissioned 5 new wind turbines in 2017. These turbines produce 8.3 megawatts of power each, for a combined total of 41.5 megawatts, powering 36,000 homes.

The National Renewable Energy Centre (Narec) is one of five centres of excellence set up by the North East's regional development agency, One NorthEast.  It was established in 2002 and is based at Eddie Ferguson House, by the Quayside.  Its purpose is to develop and test new energy technologies and equipment that will assist in the transition to a low-carbon economy.

Proposed clean coal power station

On 11 May 2007, proposals for a £2 billion clean coal power station were announced by energy supplier RWE npower.  If the plans go ahead, it is estimated that 1,500 jobs will be created for the construction, with another 200 full-time staff required for the running of the plant, which would open in 2014 on the site of the old power station.  The development would see the installation of three 800 megawatt coal-fired units, which would generate enough energy to supply around 3.5 million homes.  These plans have, however, met some opposition; many residents living in the area feel that the land should be redeveloped for other purposes, rather than continue to be used as an industrial site.  The MP for Wansbeck, Denis Murphy, stated that, although the project would have benefits for the area, he still had concerns; Ronnie Campbell, the MP for Blyth Valley, claimed he would welcome the development as long as it did not have an adverse effect on the overall regeneration of the area.

Britishvolt

In December 2020, Blyth was confirmed as the location for a new Britishvolt battery manufacturing plant. In July 2021, plans for the £2.6bn gigafactory employing 3,000 people were approved, with the new plant to be located on former coalyards adjacent to the now-demolished power station in Cambois, near Blyth. It will produce lithium-ion batteries for the automotive industry. Britishvolt appointed ISG as its construction partner who began work on clearing the site in late 2021. In January 2022, the UK government, through its Automotive Transformation Fund, invested £100m in the Britishvolt project, alongside asset management company abrdn and its property investment arm Tritax, developing what was planned to be Britain's fourth largest building. However, construction work was halted in August 2022 amid funding concerns, with manufacturing now not set to start until mid-2025, more than a year later than initially planned. On 17 January 2023, Britishvolt went into administration, and its factory site was put up for sale.

Urban regeneration
Commercial developments in the town centre have also helped to revitalise Blyth.  Opened in 1991, the Keel Row Shopping Centre has brought many large high street retailers to the town.  Several streets and many derelict buildings, including the old council offices, were cleared away to make way for the development. Adjacent, is the thrice weekly market which is held on Tuesdays, Fridays and Saturdays.  On 14 March 2009, the market was officially reopened following a £3 million refurbishment, which involved the installation of new paving, seating, lighting, and a water feature.  The centrepiece is an artwork by Simon Watkinson, named Hyperscope; the  stainless steel column incorporates lighting effects and represents the town's coal mining heritage and history as a wartime submarine base.  The aim of the refurbishment is to attract people to the market area when the market is closed, and to bring further investment to the town.  However, the project has received criticism; following approval of the proposals in June 2007, concern was raised by Councillor Alisdair Gibbs-Barton, who said that the market place was beginning to resemble a park, and that more trade should be being encouraged.  Following the reopening there were also claims that new stalls provided to market traders are unable to withstand adverse weather conditions, and that traders were being overcharged for stall space.

Employment 
The closure of Blyth's male-dominated heavy industries during the latter half of the 20th century led to a shift towards more female-dominated light industries, many of which were based on the new Blyth and Kitty Brewster trading estates.  At the 2001 UK census, the industries of employment of residents of Blyth were 19.44% manufacturing, 16.82% retail, 11.82% health and social work, 8.83% construction, 8.58% public administration and defence, 8.33% real estate, 6.69% transport and communications, 5.23% education, 4.53% hotels and catering, 3.13% finance, 0.92% utilities, 0.66% agriculture and forestry, 0.65% mining and quarrying, 0.07% fishing, and 4.29% other industries.  The census showed that the economic activity of residents aged 16–74 was 39.35% in full-time employment, 11.82% in part-time employment, 4.65% self-employed, 5.37% unemployed, 1.57% economically active students, 3.02% economically inactive students, 14.42% retired, 6.89% looking after home or family, 9.69% permanently sick or disabled, and 3.23% economically inactive for other reasons.

Demography 
Blyth is the largest town in Northumberland; at the 2011 UK census it had a population of 37,339. There were 16,961 households, of which 16,381 (96.6%) had at least one resident. For every 1000 females there were 948 males. The age distribution was 6.1% 0–4 years, 13.2% 5–15 years, 5.2% 16–19 years, 31.4% 20–44 years, 27.7% 45–64 years and 16.3% 65 years and over. The average age of the population was 39.7 years. The ethnicity of the town was 98.4% white, 1.0% Asian, 0.5% mixed race, and <0.1% black; other ethnic groups made up the remaining 0.1%. The place of birth of residents was 97.6% United Kingdom, 0.1% Republic of Ireland, 1.0% other European countries, and the remainder being from other countries. Religion was recorded as 62.6% Christian, 0.4% Muslim, 0.2% Sikh, 0.1% Buddhist, 0.1% Hindu and <0.1% Jewish. "Other religion" was stated by 0.4%, "no religion" was stated by 29.7% (up 16.7% since the 2001 census), and 6.6% did not state a religion. Passports were held by 74.2% of residents; 24.8% reported holding no passport. English was spoken as a main language by 98.8% of households.

{| class="wikitable" id="toc" cellspacing="3" style="float: right; margin-left: 2em"
|-
!United Kingdom Census 2001|2011 UK census||Blyth||Blyth Valley||England'|-align="center"
|Total population||37,339||82,174||53,012,456
|-align="center"
|Foreign born||2.4%||2.3%||13.8%
|-align="center"
|White||98.4%||98.7%||85.4%
|-align="center"
|Asian||1.0%||0.7%||7.8%
|-align="center"
|Christian||62.6%||64.9%||59.4%
|-align="center"
|Muslim||0.4%||0.3%||5.0%
|-align="center"
|No religion||13.0%||13.2%||24.7%
|-align="center"
|Over 65 years old||16.3%||17.1%||16.4%
|}

 Education 
Like the rest of Northumberland, Blyth has a two-tier school system consisting of first and high schools.  The town currently has nine first schools and one high school (The Blyth Academy). Until 2009 it also had five middle schools, but these schools were closed as Northumberland County Council decided to switch to a two-tier system of primary and secondary schools.

The Blyth Academy is one of three high schools in Blyth Valley. Opened on 1 September 2000 as Blyth Community College following the amalgamation of Ridley (formerly Newlands) and Tynedale high schools and built on the site of the latter, it is designed to accommodate 1,450 pupils and also serves as a centre for lifelong learning classes. In the town centre is Northumberland College's Blyth centre, as well as the public library, which holds a large collection of local studies resources. As part of a "poverty proofing" initiative, St Wilfrid's Primary School banned pencil cases in 2018, as part of a charity initiative to avoid poorer pupils being viewed negatively for lacking designer goods.

Bede Academy, a school for children aged 3 to 18 sponsored by Sir Peter Vardy through the Emmanuel Schools Foundation, opened in September 2009. Bede Academy is built on the former grounds of Ridley High School (formerly Newlands).

The Dales School is a special needs school. In July 2021, it received a Class 144 train. In April 2019, Blyth won a government bid to establish a 80-place special school for children with specific learning difficulties. The proposed site is the former Princess Louise First School.

In October, Blyth was awarded government funding to establish mental health support teams in schools. The scheme, which requires the county's mental health services to see children within four weeks of referral, is planned to be rolled out by December 2020.

 Entertainment and leisure 

 Events and venues 
Held every July, the annual Blyth Town Summer Fair takes place in and around the market place and hosts many attractions, such as music performances, arts and crafts exhibitions, fairground rides and children's entertainment.  The Blyth Town Christmas Fayre is also held in the market place and features a similar range of family entertainment.  Close to the town centre is an intimate, 299-seat theatre called the Phoenix Theatre. It presents a regular programme of professional performing arts to the local community and has successfully brought amateur and professional practitioners alongside each other to develop work for the community.  There were once four cinemas in Blyth, but the last of these, the Wallaw, closed in 2004. The others — The Central, The Essoldo and The Roxy — all closed in the 1960s and 1970s.

 Sport and recreation 
The town is home to the non-League football club, Blyth Spartans.  Founded in 1899, and play their home games at Croft Park.  They are notable for their "giant-killing" feats in the FA Cup, particularly those of the 1977–78 season, when they reached the fifth round.  The town's other non-League football club is Blyth Town, who were established in 1995 and play in the Wade Associates Northern Alliance Premier Division.  Also based in Blyth are Blyth Cricket Club and Blyth RFC. Blyth Cricket Club was formed in 1883 and presently compete in the Northumberland & Tyneside Cricket League Division 3. Blyth Cricket Club were Northumberland & Tyneside Cricket League Division 4 champions in the 2020 season and Northumberland Premier League champions in 2017.

Blyth Sports Centre offers a wide range of facilities including two swimming pools, a sports hall, squash courts, fitness suite, saunas, outdoor skate park, and more.  Blyth Golf Club is situated on the outskirts of the town at New Delaval, and has an 18-hole course with a par of 72. Royal Northumberland Yacht Club has its headquarters in the South Harbour.  RNYC offers crewing and sailing opportunities and is a Royal Yachting Association Training Centre for sail cruising and powerboating for its members.

 Parks and open spaces 
Ridley Park was created on land handed over by Viscount Matthew White Ridley and was opened on 27 July 1904.  In June 2005, a £602,000 regeneration project was completed, which saw the installation of a children's water play area and upgrading of existing play facilities at the southern end of the park.  The Quayside is a stretch of the riverfront that was once a centre of Blyth's industry, where coal would be loaded from trains onto ships for export, but having undergone major redevelopment, it is now a clean and peaceful area.  Notable features of the Quayside include the "Spirit of the Staithes" sculpture and eleven "solar sound posts" which, when approached, replay pre-recorded stories relating to the port told by local people.  Blyth's largest and most natural open space is its beach and sand dunes, which stretch from the mouth of the river to Seaton Sluice.  The dunes were declared a Local Nature Reserve by Blyth Valley Borough Council in December 2003, and are also an area of Special Nature Conservation Interest.  They are notable for their diverse range of plant life, butterflies, moths and birds, as well as being one of only two coastal locations in the country inhabited by both species of banded land snail—Cepaea nemoralis and Cepaea hortensis.

 Landmarks and places of interest 

The "Spirit of the Staithes" sculpture on Blyth's Quayside was unveiled by Princess Anne on 28 May 2003.  As part of the overall regeneration of the Quayside, it was commissioned by Blyth Valley Council in conjunction with Northern Arts and created by the artist Simon Packard.  Standing 15 metres (50 ft) high and 7 metres (22 ft) wide, it represents the heritage of coal distribution in Europe, an industry in which Blyth was the largest exporter.

The "High Light" lighthouse is one of Blyth's oldest structures. Prior to land reclamation in the late 19th century, the lighthouse had been much closer to the quayside. At some stage it became the rear of a pair of leading lights, and known as the 'High Light'; the corresponding 'low light' has long since been demolished. Blyth High Light was deactivated in 1985 and listed Grade II on 15 July 1987.

Before their demolition, the four chimneys of Blyth Power Station dominated the landscape along the coast.

On the north side of the River Blyth are the remains of the railway coal staithes which featured in the chase scene at the end of the 1971 film Get Carter'', starring Michael Caine.

Notable people
Mark Knopfler, singer of Dire Straits, grew up in Blyth
Dan Burn, Newcastle United football player.
Jean Heywood, actress

See also
Blyth Shipbuilding Company
Headway Arts
Wellesley Nautical School

References

Printed sources and further reading

External links 

Blyth Town Council Website

 
Towns in Northumberland
Ports and harbours of Northumberland
Port cities and towns of the North Sea
Populated coastal places in Northumberland
Royal Navy submarine bases
Civil parishes in Northumberland